Patrick Brasca (born September 6, 1999) known professionally in Chinese as Pai Weijun is a Canadian-Taiwanese pop singer and songwriter known for singing the theme song "Try" of the film Kung Fu Panda 3. The song also features Jay Chou.

Career
Patrick Brasca is of mixed Italian and Taiwanese heritage. He learned African drums when he was just three and learned the acoustic guitar when he was 9. At the age of 11, he had already set his hopes on becoming a singer. At the mere age of 13, while taking part in a variety show hosted by Harlem Yu, Brasca met Jay Chou, who signed him to his record company JVR Music. Brasca also uses the mononym Patrick in some of his recordings.

On 29 October 2015, he released the single "Can't Lose You Now" with an accompanying music video. It became part of the soundtrack of popular Taiwanese TV series Love or Spend. Brasca followed up this release with "My Time" (我的時代) on 20 November 2015 and "I Like You" on 17 December 2015. The two songs were included on his first EP single also called My Time in 2015.

The Taiwanese musician, pop singer, songwriter, record producer, director and actor Jay Chou suggested that Brasca become part of the soundtrack of 2016 American-Chinese computer-animated action comedy martial arts film Kung Fu Panda 3, produced by DreamWorks Animation and Oriental DreamWorks. The bilingual theme song from the film titled "Try" featured Patrick Brasca (in English) and Jay Chou (in Chinese). Brasca took part in the writing of the English lyrics of the track. The soundtrack album was released on January 22, 2016 with Brasca and Jay Chou's "Try" as its title track.

In popular culture
Brasca sang "Be Strong", the theme song for the 2016 International Children's Games held in New Taipei City in Taiwan.

Discography

Albums
Angst  (2020)
[10 tracks: Butterflies (2:51) / Champagne feat. ANGIE (3:06) / I Like The Way (3:40) / Somebody (2:44) /  Don't Wanna Lie ft. 8lak & Hosea (2:53) / You Are (2:53) / Won’t Say I Love You (2:48) / Matches (2:50) / Runaway (2:50) / Angst (2:58)]

EPs
My Time (2015) 
[2 track EP: "Can't Lose You Now" (4:07) / "My Time (4:03)]

Songs and music videos
"Soar High" (2019)
"Don't Wanna Lie" (feat. 8lak, Hosea) (2020)
"4 Get Bout U" (with Tyson Yoshi) (2020)
"Butterfly" (2020)
"Somebody" (2020)
"Champagne" (feat. ANGIE) (2020) 
"I Like the Way" (2020)
"Runaway" (2021)
"Cold" feat. @莫宰羊 (2021)

Soundtracks
Love or Spend (2015)
"Can't Lose You Now"  
"My Time" 
"I Like You" 
Kung Fu Panda 3 (2016)
"Try" (with Jay Chou) 
Superpower (2017)
"Superpower" (2017) (closing song)
GunGirls (2017)
"Gun Fire" (closing song)
Dream Breaker (2018)
"City of Dreams"

Remix
Jay Chou - 忍者 (Patrick Brasca x MADREX Remix) (2019)

Others
"Be Strong" (theme song of the 2016 International Children's Games) (2016) 
"奇市江湖" (theme song of the 2017 Taobao Marketplace Festival)

References

External links

Taiwanese male singers
Canadian musicians of Chinese descent
Taiwanese people of Italian descent
1999 births
Living people
21st-century Taiwanese singers
21st-century Canadian male singers